Long Lake was a federal electoral district in Saskatchewan, Canada, that was represented in the House of Commons of Canada from 1925 to 1935.

This riding was created in 1924 from parts of Last Mountain and Regina ridings.

It was abolished in 1933 when it was redistributed into Lake Centre and Rosthern ridings.

Election results

|Independent Progressive
|KETCHESON, Harry Wilmot ||align=right|1,768

 
|Farmer
|MCNEAL, Ida Elizabeth ||align=right| 1,516

See also 

 List of Canadian federal electoral districts
 Past Canadian electoral districts

External links 
 

Former federal electoral districts of Saskatchewan